{{Speciesbox
| name = Red-faced turtle
| fossil_range =
| image =Emydura australis lateral.gif
| image_caption =
| genus = Emydura
| species = victoriae
| authority = (Gray, 1842)<ref name=gray1842>Gray, J.E. (1842). "Description of some hitherto unrecorded species of Australian reptiles and batrachians". pp 51-57.  In: Gray, J.E. Zoological Miscellaney. London: Treuttel, Wurtz and Co.</ref>
| synonyms = See text
| synonyms_ref = 
}}Emydura victoriae, also known commonly as the red-faced turtle, Victoria short-necked turtle and Victoria River turtle, is a species of medium-sized aquatic turtle in the family Chelidae. The species inhabits rivers, streams and permanent water bodies across much of northern Australia.

Etymology
The specific name, victoriae, refers to the Victoria River (Northern Territory).

Taxonomy
The species E. victiriae has a disrupted nomenclatural history. For many years it appeared in the literature as Emydura australis (Gray 1841: 445) however in 1983 this name was synonymised with Emydura macquarii, incorrectly according to Iverson et al. 2001. Since this time the species has been known as Emydura victoriae this name too has nomenclatural issues and it is possible the names may eventually be reversed again.

Synonymy
Hydraspis victoriae Gray 1842: 55
Chelymys victoriae — Gray 1872: 21
Emydura victoriae — Worrell 1964: 17
Tropicochelymys victoriae — Wells & Wellington, 1985: 9
Emydura victoria Cann, 1997: 28  (ex errore)

Nota bene: Synonyms without dashes are new taxa; synonyms with dashes are just new combinations.

References

Emydura
Reptiles described in 1842
Taxa named by John Edward Gray
Turtles of Australia